Pygoda civilis is a species of stink bug in the family Pentatomidae found in Ecuador.
It was first described as Edessa civilis by Gustav Breddin in 1903 and renamed under genus Pygoda in 2018.

References

Pentatomidae
Insects described in 1903